Daochi Wan is a blackish-brown honeyed pill used in Traditional Chinese medicine to "remove heat, quench fire, relieve dysuria and to relax bowels". It is used in cases where there are "ulcers in the mouth or on the tongue, sore throat, fidgetness and distress in the chest, micturition of small amount of red urine, and constipation due to virulent-internal-heat".  
It tastes sweet and bitter.

Chinese classic herbal formula

See also
 Chinese classic herbal formula
 Bu Zhong Yi Qi Wan

References

Traditional Chinese medicine pills